The National Order of Quebec, termed officially in French as l'Ordre national du Québec, and in English abbreviation as the Order of Quebec, is an order of merit in the Canadian province of Quebec. Instituted in 1984 when Lieutenant Governor Jean-Pierre Côté granted royal assent to the  Loi sur l'Ordre national du Québec (National Order of Quebec Act), the order is administered by the Governor-in-Council and is intended to honour current or former Quebec residents for conspicuous achievements in any field, being thus described as the highest honour in Quebec.

Structure and appointment
Although the National Order of Quebec was established with the granting of royal assent by Quebec's lieutenant governor and the Canadian sovereign is the fount of honour, the viceroy does not, as in other provinces, form an explicit part of the organization. Instead, the monarch's representative is related to the order only by virtue of his or her place in council, collectively termed the government of Quebec, to which the constitution of the Order of Quebec makes specific reference.

The order contains three grades, each with accordant post-nominal letters and place in the Canadian order of precedence for honours, decorations, and medals. They are, in descending hierarchical order:

 Grand Officer (grand officier/grande officière) (GOQ)
 Officer (officier/officière) (OQ)
 Knight (chevalier/chevalière) (CQ)

Nominations to the National Order of Quebec are sought in Quebec's daily and weekly media publications and are directed to the Council of the National Order of Quebec, elected by and amongst the members of the order for a period of three years and headed by a president elected by the council for two years. This body is mandated to short-list candidates and forward their suggestions to the Governor-in-Council. Any person born, living, or who has lived in Quebec, save for anyone serving as a Member of the National Assembly of Quebec, is eligible to be nominated and names may be submitted posthumously. The Cabinet may also, without the input of the Council of the National Order of Quebec, put forward the names of non-Quebecers for appointment as honorary members. Promotion through the grades is possible for both substantive and honorary members. Admission recognizes conspicuous meritorious actions that improve or support Quebec and/or its language and culture.

Insignia

Upon admission into the Order of Quebec, members are presented with various insignia of the organization—a medallion, miniature, and button. All are administered by the Regulations for the Insignia of the National Order of Quebec and were designed by Madeleine Dansereau, who was inspired by the heraldic elements of the provincial flag, notably the colours of blue and white used on the order's ribbon and the fleur-de-lis. The badge of a Grand Officer consists of two 18kt gold plates, in the shape of a cross formed by two  by  arms, symmetrically superimposed atop one another 4 mm apart, the obverse face a high-polish, rusticated surface; at the lower left corner is a white enamel fleur-de-lis. On the reverse of the badge is inscribed the order's motto—Honneur au peuple du Québec (homage to the people of Quebec)—and a serial number at the base of the vertical bar. A lapel pin is also used for wear on casual civilian clothing.

The regulations of the National Order of Quebec stipulate that the premier presents new inductees with their insignia, either on the National Holiday of Quebec or another day during the National Week. The ceremony takes place in the Salon Rouge of the parliament building in Quebec City, though exceptions are sometimes made when inductees cannot be present (notably for some non-Quebecer appointments). The insignia remain property of the Crown in Right of Quebec and must be returned upon a holder's cessation of membership in the society, whether by death or dismissal.

Inductees
The following are some notable appointees into the National Order of Quebec:

Quebec inductees

Grand Officer

 Jean Victor Allard , Chief of the Defence Staff, appointed 1985
 Marcel Bélanger , economist, appointed 1974
 Jean Béliveau , hockey player, appointed 2010
 Lucien Bouchard , 27th Premier of Quebec, appointed 2008
 Robert Bourassa , 22nd Premier of Quebec, appointed posthumously 2008
 Jean Campeau , politician and businessman, appointed Grand Officer in 1990
 Leonard Norman Cohen , singer-songwriter, appointed 2008
 Robert Després , businessman, appointed 2003
 Jean Drapeau , mayor of Montreal, appointed 1987
 Marcelle Ferron , painter and stained glass artist, appointed 1992
 Gérard Filion , newspaper director, appointed 1989
 Armand Frappier , researcher, appointed 1985
 Paul Gérin-Lajoie , appointed Officer in 1987 and Grand Officer in 1998
 Phil Gold , scientist, physician, appointed Officer in 1989 and Grand Officer in 2019
 Pierre-Marc Johnson , 24th Premier of Quebec, appointed 2008
 Phyllis Barbara Lambert , architect and philanthropist
 Bernard Landry , 28th Premier of Quebec, appointed 2008
 Charles Philippe Leblond , scientist, professor, appointed Grand Officer in 2001
 Félix Leclerc , singer-songwriter, appointed 1985
 Jean Paul Lemieux , painter, appointed posthumously 1997
 René Lévesque , 23rd Premier of Quebec, appointed posthumously 2008
 Martin Brian Mulroney , 18th Prime Minister of Canada, appointed 2002
 Alanis Obomsawin , filmmaker, First Nations activist, appointed 2016
 Jacques Parizeau , 26th Premier of Quebec, appointed 2008
 Jean-Paul Riopelle , painter, appointed Officer in 1988 and Grand Officer in 1994
 Jean Vanier , philanthropist, theologian, founder of L'Arche, appointed 1992
 Gilles Vigneault , singer-songwriter, appointed Knight in 1985 and Grand Officer in 2000

Officer

 Laurent Beaudoin , businessman appointed 1990
 Francesco Bellini , research scientist and entrepreneur, appointed 2004
 Daniel Borsuk , plastic surgeon, appointed 2019
 Michel Brault , filmmaker, appointed 2003
 Boris Brott , conductor, appointed 2014
 Solange Chaput-Rolland , appointed 1985
 Jean Coutu , businessman, appointed 1993
 Bernard Derome , news anchor, appointed 2006
 Céline Dion , singer, appointed 1998
 Léon Dion , author, teacher, intellectual, appointed 1990
 Fernand Dumont , author, intellectual, appointed 1992
 Denise Filiatrault , playwright, actor, appointed 2000
 Anne Hébert , writer, appointed 1985
 Larkin Kerwin , physicist, appointed 1988
 Lucia Kowaluk , community activist, appointed 2014
 Louis Laberge , union leader, appointed 1988
 Normand Laprise , chef and author, appointed 2009
 Robert Lepage , playwright, filmmaker, appointed 1999
 Monique F. Leroux,  businesswoman, appointed 2012
 Jean-Louis Lévesque , entrepreneur, philanthropist, appointed 1991
 André Melançon OQ, actor, screenwriter and film director, appointed 2013
 Gaston Miron , poet, appointed 1996
 Ted Moses , aboriginal chief, appointed 2002
 Lise Payette , politician, writer, appointed 2001
 Pierre Péladeau  businessman, appointed 1989
 Louise Penny , author, appointed 2017
 Hubert Reeves , astrophysicist, appointed 1994
 Maurice Richard , hockey player, appointed 1985
 Mary Simon , Governor General of Canada, appointed 1992
 Mary Two-Axe Earley , women's rights activist, appointed 1985
 Jacques Villeneuve , racing driver, appointed 1998

Knight

 Jacques Amyot , long-distance swimmer, appointed 2001
 Denys Arcand , filmmaker, appointed 1990
 Frédéric Back , animator, appointed 1989
 Alice Benjamin, appointed 1993
 Sylvie Bernier , Olympic diver, appointed 1985
 Ferdinand Biondi , radio broadcaster, appointed 1985
 Neil Bissoondath , author, appointed 2010
 Denise Bombardier , journalist, appointed 2000
 Claire Bonenfant , president of the Quebec Status of Women Council, appointed 1991
 Émile Bouchard , hockey player, appointed 2008
 Gaétan Boucher , speed skater, appointed 1985
 Isabelle Boulay , singer, appointed 2012
 Pierre Bourque , mayor of Montreal, appointed 1993
 Françoise David , social and feminist activist, appointed 1999
 Yvon Deschamps , comedian, appointed 2001
 Jean Duceppe , actor, appointed 1985
 Diane Dufresne , singer and painter, appointed 2002
 Laurent Duvernay-Tardif , NFL player, appointed 2019
 Gad Elmaleh, comedian, appointed 2017
 Marc Favreau , actor, appointed 1995
 Jean-Pierre Ferland , singer-songwriter
 Madeleine Ferron , writer, appointed 1992
 Daniel Germain , philanthropist, appointed 1997
 Jacques Godbout , writer and filmmaker, appointed 1998
 Marc-André Hamelin , pianist
 Otto Joachim , composer, musician, painter, appointed 1993
 Roland-Benoît Jomphe , poet, appointed 1987
 Oliver Theophilus Jones , pianist, organist, composer and arranger, appointed 1994
 Pauline Julien , singer-songwriter, appointed 1997
 Madeleine Juneau , museologist, teacher, nun, appointed 2017
 Marie-Claire Kirkland-Casgrain , appointed 1985
 Françoise Labbé , artist, appointed 1997
 Jacques Lacombe , conductor, appointed 2012
 Jacques Lacoursière , historian, appointed 2002
 Guy Lafleur , hockey player, appointed 2005
 Guy Laliberté , appointed 1997
 Mario Lemieux , hockey player, appointed 2009
 Michel Lemieux , performance artist and theatre director, appointed 2014
 Édouard Lock , dancer, appointed 2001
 Louis Lortie , pianist, appointed 1998
 Norman McLaren , animator and filmmaker, appointed 1985
 Julie Payette , astronaut, appointed 2000
 Oscar Peterson , jazz musician, appointed 1991
 Chantal Petitclerc , wheelchair athlete, Canadian senator, appointed 2005
 Samuel Pierre, professor, appointed 2009
 Victor Pilon , director, theatre designer, visual designer and photographer, appointed 2014
 Luc Plamondon , songwriter, appointed 1990
 Jean-Louis Roux , actor and Lieutenant Governor of Quebdec, appointed 1989
 Hubert Sacy , General manager of Éduc’alcool, appointed 2010
 Pierre Théberge , Museum director
 :fr:Michèle Thibodeau-DeGuire , engineer, appointed in 2005
 Michel Tremblay , playwright and author, appointed 1991
 Alain Trudel , conductor and trombonist, appointed 2019
 Jesús Carles de Vilallonga , painter, appointed 2011
 Denis Villeneuve , director and screenwriter, appointed in 2019
 Paul Zumthor , medievalist and literary historian, appointed 1992

Non-Quebec inductees

Honorary Grand Officer

 Charles Dutoit , conductor, appointed 1995
 François Hollande , President of France, appointed 2014

Honorary Officer

 Raymond Barre , Prime Minister of France, appointed 1986
 Jacques Chirac , President of France, appointed 1987
 Jim Douglas , Governor of Vermont, appointed 2010
 Michel Drucker , television host, appointed Knight 2001, Officer 2010
 Laurent Fabius , Prime Minister of France, appointed 1986
 Lionel Jospin , Prime Minister of France, appointed 1998
 Alain Juppé , Prime Minister of France, appointed 1996
 Antonine Maillet , Acadian writer and playwright, appointed 1990
 Nana Mouskouri , Greek singer, appointed 2013
 Alain Peyrefitte , FrenCch politician, appointed 1998
 Jordi Pujol , President of the Generalitat of Catalonia, appointed 1996
 Jean-Pierre Raffarin , Prime Minister of France, appointed 2003
 Michel Rocard , Prime Minister of France, appointed 2000
 Philippe Séguin , President of the French National Assembly, appointed 2000
 Edmund Stoiber , Minister-President of Bavaria, appointed 2003
 Vaira Vīķe-Freiberga , President of Latvia, appointed 2006

Honorary Knight

 David Azrieli , architect, appointed 1999
 Gérard Depardieu , actor, appointed 2002
 Bernard Pivot , television host, appointed 2001

See also
 Canadian order of precedence (decorations and medals)
 Symbols of Quebec
 State decoration
 Prix du Québec

Notes

References

External links

 

Provincial and territorial orders of Canada
!
Quebec awards
1984 establishments in Quebec